This is a list of Wisden Trophy Test cricket series played between England and West Indies which dates back to 1963. It was usually played alternately in England and West Indies, although early series were predominantly played in England. "The Wisden Trophy" series varied between three and six Tests.

In the series' 57-year history, the trophy changed hands on seven occasions (1968, 1973, 2000, 2009 (twice), 2019 and 2020). The West Indies won the first Wisden Trophy in 1963 and held the cup until 1968. England then held the trophy for a brief period between 1968 and 1973. After the 1973 series the West Indies retained the trophy for 27 years. This included a 16-year period (1974–1990) where the West Indies did not lose a Test. The new millennium proved to be the turning point in the series as England won the 2000 Wisden Trophy 3–1 to regain the trophy after West Indies went 1–0 up. They have been largely successful against the West Indies at test-level since then, with the latter only being successful in two series since; in 2009 and 2019. To put the recent dominance by England into perspective, since the Millennium, West Indies have won only 7 Tests, to England's 23, and that was after the West Indies won the very first Test of the new Millennium at Edgbaston in 2000.

The last Wisden Trophy series took place in England in 2020 and consisted of three Test matches. The Wisden Trophy will be replaced by the Richards–Botham Trophy, named in honour of Viv Richards and Ian Botham, for future series. Overall, a total of 28 Wisden Trophy series were played, of which the West Indies won fourteen times, England won ten and there were four drawn series.

List of Test series

Summary of results

List of captains
The table below is a list of cricket captains for each team in the Wisden Trophy. The list is in chronological order of appearance.

Wisden Trophy records

Team records

Higher innings totals were scored outside The Wisden Trophy era. In the 1930 timeless Test England scored 849 on their first innings at Sabina Park. Other high scores include West Indies 681/8 declaration in 1954 at the Queen's Park Oval.

Batting records
Brian Lara is the record holder in the Wisden Trophy for most runs with 2983 runs. Garry Sobers did make 3214 runs against England however his first 1069 runs occurred before the Wisden Trophy was established meaning he has only scored
2145 runs in the Wisden Trophy. Andy Sandham scored 325 runs against the West Indies in 1930 (which at the time was a world record) but this was before the inception of the Wisden Trophy and is therefore not a Wisden Record.

Other batting feats include:
 Viv Richards 56 ball century in the fifth Test of the 1985–86 series is the fastest Test century (in terms of balls faced).
 Andy Roberts scored 25 runs in one over in the first Test of the 1980–81 series. This is the fourth most runs in a single over at Test level. The over went 46266L.

Bowling records

Sobers took 102 wickets against England, however 18 of these wickets occurred before the Wisden Trophy was instituted and therefore meant that he only took 84 wickets in Wisden Trophy matches. Alf Valentine claimed 33 wickets (from 422.3 overs) for the West Indies in the 1950 tour against England before the Wisden Trophy was established.

Other bowling feats include:
 Dominic Cork's hat-trick in the fourth Test of the 1995 series dismissing Richie Richardson (bowled), Junior Murray (lbw) and Carl Hooper (lbw).
 Matthew Hoggard's hat-trick in the third Test of the 2003–04 series dismissing Ramnaresh Sarwan (caught), Shivnarine Chanderpaul (lbw) and Ryan Hinds (caught). The over finished 000WWW.
 Andrew Caddick's four wicket over in the fourth Test of the 2000 series. This was the sixth time this had occurred at Test level. In the over he dismissed Ridley Jacobs (lbw), Nixon McLean (bowled), Curtly Ambrose (bowled) and Reon King (bowled) and the over finished W0WW0nbW.

Captaincy records
John Goddard won five Test matches as captain for West Indies but this occurred between 1948 and 1957 before the Wisden Trophy was established.

See also
Cricket statistics

References

Test cricket competitions
West Indies in international cricket
England in international cricket
Wis
Wis
Wisden Trophy